Customs United Football Club is a Thai football club under the stewardship of Customs Department based in Samut Prakan province. They currently play in the Thai League 2.

Recent history

Their biggest success to date was to win the Championship in 2007 of the Thai Division 1 League and earn the right to promotion to the Thai Premier League. 
Their stay in the Premier League only lasted one season and they finished bottom of the league.
For the 2009 season they returned to the 1st Division. 
In 2010 the Customs Department changed their name to Suvarnabhumi Customs FC and played their home fixtures at the Lad Krabang 54 Stadium, this was after they announced in January of that year that they were moving to Phetchburi, this move never happened. They finished 7th which was one place off the TPL playoffs which were being held due to league expansion.
The next season saw another change of name, this time to Samut Prakan Customs United F.C.
The club were relegated from Division 1 in 2011 and dropped into the Bangkok regional league. The club also dropped the 'Samut Prakan' tag and were known as Customs United for the beginning of the 2012 season.

Club achievements
 Thai League 3
 Runners-up (1): 2018
 Thai League 3 Lower Region
 Champions (1): 2018
 Thailand Division 1 League:
Winner Group A: 2007
Regional League Bangkok Area Division:
Winner: 2015

Stadium and locations

Season by season record

Club staff

Coaches
Coaches by Years (2006–present)

Players

Current squad

Out on loan

Former players
  Choklap Nilsang
  Panuwat Failai
  Masao Kiba
  Lee Jung-jin

References

External links
 Official Website
 https://www.facebook.com/customsunitedfc

Football clubs in Thailand
Association football clubs established in 1954
1954 establishments in Thailand
Financial services association football clubs in Thailand